Tamparuli is a state constituency in Sabah, Malaysia, that has been represented in the Sabah State Legislative Assembly. It is mandated to return a single member to the Assembly under the first-past-the-post voting system.

Polling districts 
As at 24th September 2019, this constituency contains the polling districts of Tenghilan, Rani, Rungus, Rengalis, Topokon, Sawah, Tamparuli, Mengkaladoi, Gayaratau, Kilang Bata, and Telibong.

History

Election result

References 

Sabah state constituencies